Ema Abina (born 18 February 1999) is a Slovenian handball player for RK Krim and the Slovenian national team.

She represented Slovenia at the 2020 European Women's Handball Championship. She is the sister of Ana Abina.

References

1999 births
Living people
Slovenian female handball players
Handball players from Ljubljana